Britt Eila Maria Olauson (born 1945) is a Swedish politician and former member of the Riksdag, the national legislature. A member of the Social Democratic Party, she represented Östergötland County between April 2006 and October 2006.

References

1945 births
21st-century Swedish women politicians
Living people
Members of the Riksdag 2002–2006
Members of the Riksdag from the Social Democrats
Women members of the Riksdag